Oxfordian may refer to:

Oxfordian (stage), a geological time interval in the Jurassic period
Oxfordian theory of Shakespeare authorship, the view that Edward de Vere wrote under Shakespeare's name
A person or thing associated with Oxford or Oxford University